Long Bay may refer to:

 Long Bay, Barbados
 Long Bay, Ontario, Canada
 Long Bay, New Zealand, a suburb of Auckland
 Long Bay Beach, in Manchester Parish Jamaica
 Long Bay Beach (Portland Parish, Jamaica), in Portland Parish, Jamaica
 Long Bay Correctional Centre, New South Wales, Australia
 Grand Strand or Long Bay, a stretch of beaches along the coast of South Carolina, U.S.
 Long Bay in North Anguilla